Get Medieval is an action game developed and published by Monolith Productions and Microïds for Microsoft Windows in 1998. It is an overhead shooter in which the player can control one of four characters in a dungeon. Get Medieval gameplay is similar to that of Atari Games's 1985 arcade game Gauntlet.

Gameplay
It can be played in three modes (Dragon Quest, Random Dungeon, Custom Dungeon) and on four difficulty levels. The game's four player characters: Archer (Eryc), The Barbarian (Zared), The Sorceress (Levina), and The Avenger (Kellina), differ only in speed and strength. The slowest character (Zared) is the strongest, the fastest (Eryc) the weakest. Players can find Attack and Defense upgrades, losing them once their characters die. In the multiplayer mode, the game can be played via hotseat or network.

This game came with a world editor called "GMedit" (or "WapWorld"), which allows players to make custom levels. Users can do everything that Monolith Games did in their levels, but it does not give a full control on the level. Custom levels can only contain a maximum of five kinds of enemies and their spawners in a specific dungeon.

Plot
The female warrior Kellina's father was killed by a giant dragon that terrorizes the kingdom and dwells in a dungeon protected by its minions. Kellina and her friends embark on a quest to kill the dragon.

Reception

The game received average reviews according to the review aggregation website GameRankings. IGNs Trent C. Ward complimented the game's presentation, but felt that the humor in the game was overdone. Jason D'Aprile of GamePro noted the game's similarity to Gauntlet, but praised the game's sound effects and overall look. GameSpots Tahsin Shamma wrote, "this game may be Gauntlet, but Gauntlet is still a lot of fun." GameRevolution called it "a nice update to a classic game [that] understands its limits and accepts its fate with wry humor." Next Generation wrote, "does the game offer anything new? Not really. But if you want to see how the pre-Pentium crowd lived, Get Medieval offers a pleasurable peek at the arcade arenas of the past, complete with chuckles."

References

External links
Get Medieval at Monolith website (archived)

1998 video games
Action video games
Video games about dragons
Fantasy video games
Microïds games
Monolith Productions games
Top-down video games
Video games developed in the United States
Video games featuring female protagonists
Video games scored by Daniel Bernstein
Video game clones
Windows games
Windows-only games
Video games with pre-rendered 3D graphics
Multiplayer and single-player video games
CDV Software Entertainment games
TopWare Interactive games